The Case of the 61 Renegades Clique was created during the Cultural Revolution by Kang Sheng.

Members
high-ranking officials (22 people): Bo Yibo, Liu Lantao, An Ziwen, Yang Xianzhen, Zhou Zhongying, Ma Huizhi, Xu Zirong, Fu Yutian, Wang Hefeng, Liu Chuli, Wang De, Hou Zhenya, Wang Qimei, Liu Youguang, Hu Xikui, Liao Luyan, Zhang Xi, Li Liguo, Liu Xiwu, Peng De, Liu Zijiu and Zhao Lin
middle-ranking posts (13 people)
low-ranking posts (5 people)
killed in action (10 people)
Died after being released from prison (5 people): Yin Jian
Committed suicide (1 person)
Defected to Kuomintang after being released from prison (2 people)
Unknown fate (3 people)

References
 《毛泽东文集》第一卷 "给宋哲元的信"一九三六年八月十四日 
 Mao Zedong (February 1967). "对中央关于刘澜涛出狱问题的复电稿和张闻天有关证明材料的批语" in 《建国以来毛泽东文稿》, Volume 12. Beijing: Central Party Literature Press (中央文献出版社). 注释3："张闻天，一九三五年一月遵义会议后根据中共中央政治局常委分工分工负总责。"

 
Cultural Revolution